An anniversary is the date on which an event took place or an institution was founded in a previous year, and may also refer to the commemoration or celebration of that event. The word was first used for Catholic feasts to commemorate saints.

Most countries celebrate national anniversaries, typically called national days. These could be the date of independence of the nation or the adoption of a new constitution or form of government. There is no definite method for determining the date of establishment of an institution, and it is generally decided within the institution by convention. The important dates in a sitting monarch's reign may also be commemorated, an event often referred to as a "jubilee".

Names
 Birthdays are the most common type of anniversary, on which someone's birthdate is commemorated each year. The actual celebration is sometimes moved for practical reasons, as in the case of an official birthday or one falling on February 29.
 Wedding anniversaries are also often celebrated, on the same day of the year as the wedding occurred.
 Death anniversaries.

The Latin phrase dies natalis (literally "birth day") has become a common term, adopted in many languages, especially in intellectual and institutional circles, for the anniversary of the founding ("legal or statutory birth") of an institution, such as an alma mater (college or other school). In ancient Rome, the [dies] Aquilae natalis was the "birthday of the eagle", the anniversary of the official founding of a legion.

Anniversaries of nations are usually marked by the number of years elapsed, expressed with Latin words or Roman numerals.

Numerical

Latin terms for anniversaries are mostly straightforward, particularly those relating to the first thirty years (1–30), or multiples of ten years (30, 40, 50, 60, 70 etc.), or multiples of centuries or millenniums (100, 200, 300, 1000, 2000, 3000, etc.) In these instances, the name of the anniversary is generally derived from the Latin word(s) for the respective number of years. When anniversaries relate to fractions of centuries (125, 150, 175, 225 years—i.e. 1.25, 1.5, 1.75, and 2.25 centuries), the situation is not as simple.

Roman fractions were based on a duodecimal system. There were also special terms for quarter (quadrans), half (semis), and three-quarters (dodrans). Dodrans is a Latin contraction of de-quadrans which means "a whole unit less a quarter" (de means "from"; quadrans means "quarter"). Thus for the example of 175 years, the term is a quarter century less than the next whole (bi)century or 175 = (−25 + 200).

While secundus is Latin for "second", and bis for "twice", these terms are not used such as in sesqui-secundus. Instead sesqui (or ses) is used by itself.

Symbols
Many anniversaries have special names. Etiquette in Society, in Business, in Politics and at Home by Emily Post, published in 1922, contained suggestions for wedding anniversary gifts for 1, 5, 10, 15, 20, 25, 50, and 75 years. Wedding anniversary gift suggestions for other years were added in later editions and publications; they now comprise what is referred to as the "traditional" list. Generally speaking, the longer the period, the more precious or durable the material associated with it.

There are variations according to some national traditions. There exist numerous partially overlapping, partially contradictory lists of anniversary gifts (such as wedding stones), separate from the 'traditional' names.
The concepts of a person's birthday stone and zodiac stone, by contrast, are fixed for life according to the day of the week, month, or astrological sign corresponding to the recipient's birthday.

See also

 List of historical anniversaries
 Quinquennial Neronia
 Wedding anniversary
 Death anniversary

References

External links